The 1900 Notre Dame football team was an American football team that represented the University of Notre Dame in the 1900 college football season. In its first season with Pat O'Dea as coach, the team compiled a 6–3–1 record, shut out seven opponents, and outscored all opponents by a combined total of 261 to 73.

Schedule

References

Notre Dame
Notre Dame Fighting Irish football seasons
Notre Dame football